Republican unitary enterprise Beltelecom is the national telecommunications company in Belarus, fully owned by the Government of Belarus and operated by the Ministry of Telecommunications. Beltelecom has a network of fiber-optic trunk lines and is the sole provider of fixed telephony in Belarus. It provides long-distance and international calls, broadband access to the Internet via ADSL, and Wi-Fi services.

References

External links
 Official site

Companies of Belarus
Telecommunications companies established in 1995
Belarusian companies established in 1995